The Canal de Lalinde is a canal in south western France lateral to the Dordogne River.  Its purpose was to bypass the rapids of the river.

Locks

The canal begins with its first lock at the village of Mauzac, just below the cingle of Tremolat. Two more locks are found where the canal passes through Lalinde and Borie-Basse. The canal rejoins the Dordogne with two sets of three locks in Tuilières.

See also
 List of canals in France

References

External links

 Project Babel

Lalinde
Canals opened in 1843
1843 establishments in France
Monuments historiques of Dordogne